Walkout is a 2006 HBO film based on a true story of the 1968 East L.A. walkouts, also referred to as the Chicano blowouts. It premiered March 18, 2006 on HBO. Starring Alexa Vega, Efren Ramirez and Michael Peña, the film was directed by Edward James Olmos. Moctezuma Esparza, one of the real-life students who was involved in the walkouts, was the film's executive producer.

Plot
High school student Paula Crisostomo is tired of being treated unequally. She meets a group of student activists from around East Los Angeles and they decide to try to change the way students are treated. They are punished for speaking Spanish in school, their bathrooms are locked during lunch, they are forced to do janitorial work as a punishment, and many in the high school administrations actively dissuade the less promising students from attending college. Inspired by her Chicano teacher Sal Castro and despite opposition from her father, Paula joins in and helps hand out surveys to students to suggest improvements to the schools. Each East LA high school has two or three students who are in the group; Paula particularly becomes interested in Robert.

However the school board refuses to consider the suggestions so Paula urges the students to walk out of school. The police find out and the principal threatens to expel Paula if she walks out. Paula's father urges against her plan of "walking out." He believes that the group is a bunch of "agitators." Five East LA schools successfully walk out and the school board says they might consider their demands, but Paula's father throws her out of the house for her role in the walkout.

The students decide to walk out in only half of the schools the next day, but the police arrest and beat the protesters. None of the footage appears on the news and the students are painted as violent agitators with Communist ties. Paula decides to invite the students' families to the protests, hoping their presence will deter police brutality.

When the students walk out again their families come to support them and it appears that they have won because the school board agrees to hear their complaints. Paula invites Robert to prom, but while she is getting ready, the police suddenly arrest 12 of the leaders of the student movement. When Paula goes to Sal for advice she discovers that Robert (who is an undercover LAPD officer) has arrested him. The students are charged with conspiracy to disrupt a school with a maximum penalty of 66 years. Paula is defeated, but her father urges her not to give up and she helps to stage a massive protest outside the jail. Robert is on duty there and tries to stop her, but she continues leading the crowd until all 12 students and Sal are released.

Cast

Reception 
A month after the film first aired, 2,500 Colorado students initiated a walkout of Denver schools to protest H.R. 4437, known as the "Sensenbrenner Bill." This House bill would have made it a felony (rather than a misdemeanor) to be in the US illegally.  The bill was the catalyst for the 2006 U.S. immigration reform protests. Other student Walk Out protests in May 2006 were in part inspired by the film.

References

External links 
 

HBO Films films
Films about Mexican Americans
Films directed by Edward James Olmos
2006 television films
2006 films
Films set in the 1960s
Films set in 1968
Films about activists